Claudia Hill is an interdisciplinary artist, based in Berlin. Her work engages in performance art, costume and stage design, experimental film, visual art and sense-driven (somatic) form. Her practice has been presented internationally at venues such as Mumok, Centre Pompidou, Paris Internationale, Les Rencontres Internationales, ZKM, BAM, HAU, Broadway, the Smithsonian and New York Fashion Week.

Background and Education

Born in Germany, Hill comes from a background of tailors of Czech origin on her mother's side. In 1993, she moved to New York to study contemporary dance. Shortly after, she enrolled at
FIT and Parsons. At the same time, she began to work as a costume designer and was admitted to the United Scenic Artists in 1997. She returned to Europe in 2008 and now lives in Berlin, where she is an active member of the performing arts scene and continues to work with textiles as a costume and stage designer.

Fashion (1998–2011)

In 1998, she founded two fashion labels, the eponymous Claudia Hill and The Number After 10, which were presented and sold in Japan, the USA and Europe, at her own store, in high-end boutiques, such as Barneys New York or Fred Segal and later exclusively at private salons in limited editions. Her New York Fashion Week shows were deemed unconventional and took the form of performances or installations,  often in collaboration with other artists, such as Asymptote Architecture or Skúli Sverrisson.

Collaborations

As her designs expanded beyond the boundaries of the fashion industry, she created the costumes for William Forsythe's Decreation in 2003 and for The Wooster Group's production of Hamlet in 2007. She became a frequent collaborator of choreographer Meg Stuart, creating costumes for Sketches/Notebook and Hunter, the two productions that won Stuart the choreographer of the year award from Tanz.

References

External links
 Official Website
 
 
 

German fashion designers
German women fashion designers
German costume designers
1969 births
Living people
Fashion Institute of Technology alumni